Leptoiulus is a genus of millipedes belonging to the family Julidae.

The species of this genus are found in Europe.

Species:
 Leptoiulus abietum Verhoeff, 1914 
 Leptoiulus alemannicus (Verhoeff, 1892)

References

Julida
Millipede genera